Central Church (also known simply as Central) is a non-denominational  Evangelical multi-site megachurch in Henderson, Nevada, United States.

History
It was founded in 1962 and operates a 148,000-square-foot church building in Henderson, NV. Central also has several other locations around the world. In 2013, Outreach listed Central as the 9th largest church in the United States with an attendance of 21,055.  Jud Wilhite is the senior pastor of Central.

References

Buildings and structures in Henderson, Nevada
Organizations based in Henderson, Nevada
Churches in Clark County, Nevada
Evangelical megachurches in the United States
Evangelical churches in Nevada
Non-denominational Evangelical churches
1962 establishments in Nevada
Christian organizations established in 1962
Evangelical organizations established in the 20th century
Non-denominational Evangelical multisite churches